Robert Ioan Licu (born 7 May 1969) is a Romanian professional handball manager and former player who played as a right back. Licu is the manager of Liga Națională club Rapid București. He is the son of Ghiță Licu.

Achievements 
Liga Națională:
Winner (2): 1992, 1993 
Cupa României:
Winner (2): 1988, 1991 
DHB-Pokal:
Winner (1): 1996  
DHB-Supercup:
Winner (1): 1996  
World Championship: 
Bronze Medalist: 1990
World University Championship:
Silver Medalist: 1990
Carpathian Trophy:
Winner (2): 1991, 1995

See also
List of handballers with 1000 or more international goals

References
 

1969 births
Living people
Romanian male handball players
CS Dinamo București (men's handball) players
Handball players at the 1992 Summer Olympics
Olympic handball players of Romania  
Expatriate handball players 
Romanian expatriate sportspeople in Germany
Romanian handball coaches